Finley railway station is a heritage-listed former railway station and now museum at Narrandera-Tocumwal railway, Finley, Berrigan Shire, New South Wales, Australia. The property was added to the New South Wales State Heritage Register on 2 April 1999.

History 

The former station now hosts the Finley Pioneer Railway Museum with various artefacts. It is operated by the Finley Pioneer Rail Committee, who conduct guided tours of the site.

Description 

The type 16 timber pioneer station building dates from 1898.

The 36'x18' sub type 4 corrugated iron skillion roof also dates from 1898.

A timber stacking and storage shed and T282 5 tonne 1898 gantry crane also fall within the heritage listing.

The concrete platform has been at two levels: originally at ground level, and later at carriage entrance height.

Heritage listing 
Finley is a rare pioneer station group with the building and platform located at ground level (Yass Town railway station being the only such other building). The building is an adaptation of the standard terminus pioneer station building and has the added interest of having a raised platform added at a later date adjacent to the building. The yard contains much of the original layout and buildings with intact goods shed, gantry crane, lamp room as well a small second station building. The site represents the then outer limits of railway expansion, the intense competition between states for trade and the change in attitude to railway construction in the outer areas of the State. It was a terminus from 1898 until the line was extended to Tocumwal in 1914.

Finley Railway Precinct was listed on the New South Wales State Heritage Register on 2 April 1999 having satisfied the following criteria.

This item is assessed as historically rare. This item is assessed as arch. rare. This item is assessed as socially rare.

References

Bibliography

Attribution

External links

New South Wales State Heritage Register
Disused regional railway stations in New South Wales
Articles incorporating text from the New South Wales State Heritage Register
Railway stations in Australia opened in 1898